Lucien Neuwirth (18 May 1924 – 26 November 2013) was a French politician first elected to the French National Assembly in 1958. His namesake, the Neuwirth Law legalized birth control in France on 28 December 1967.

Biography 
Born in 1924, he joined the French Resistance in 1940 and was arrested, he later escaped through Spain. He was in London in 1944, where he discovered birth control which was then banned from France. He joined the paratroopers and fought in Brittany, Belgium and the Netherlands where he miraculously survived a firing squad in 1945.

After the war, he joined the Rally of the French People and was elected in Saint-Étienne city council. During his terms, he learned how many couple problems were caused by an unwanted birth. As a member of the military reserve force, he spent some time in Algiers around 1958 and helped in the negotiations which led to the end of the French Fourth Republic.

He was elected to the French National Assembly in 1958. With some help from the French birth control movement (Mouvement français du planning familial), he wrote a law draft to legalize birth control in 1966. He faced a violent opposition in his political family, notably the government, and successfully pleaded the case to the general De Gaulle himself. The Neuwirth Law was finally voted with left-wing support on 19 December 1967.

He stayed in the National Assembly until the pink wave of 1981, and was elected to the Senate in 1983. His main topic in his last years was palliative care, for which he supported two laws in 1995 and in 1999. He died on 26 November 2013.

References

1924 births
2013 deaths
Politicians from Saint-Étienne
Rally of the French People politicians
Union for the New Republic politicians
Union of Democrats for the Republic politicians
Rally for the Republic politicians
Deputies of the 1st National Assembly of the French Fifth Republic
Deputies of the 2nd National Assembly of the French Fifth Republic
Deputies of the 3rd National Assembly of the French Fifth Republic
Deputies of the 4th National Assembly of the French Fifth Republic
Deputies of the 5th National Assembly of the French Fifth Republic
Deputies of the 6th National Assembly of the French Fifth Republic
French Senators of the Fifth Republic
French people of German descent
Senators of Loire (department)
Commandeurs of the Légion d'honneur
Grand Officers of the Ordre national du Mérite